Chuspe (possibly from Quechua for insect, generic name of flies or two-winged insects; fly) is a mountain in the Raura mountain range in the Andes of Peru whose summit reaches an elevation of approximately . It is located in the boundary between the regions of  Lima and  Pasco. Chuspe lies north of Cushuropata.

References

Mountains of Peru
Mountains of Lima Region
Mountains of Pasco Region